RSFC may refer to:

Ransomes Sports F.C.
Rayon Sports F.C.
Resting state functional connectivity, see Resting state fMRI
Rochdale Sixth Form College